Proteromonas is a genus of heterokonts. It lives in the gut of amphibians and reptiles.

An example is Proteromonas lacertae.

Proteromonas is notable by location of mastigonemes not on its flagella, but on posterior part of the cell. Such mastigonemes are called somatonemes.

List of Species
 P. brevifilia Aléxéieff 1946
 P. dolichomastix Künstler 1889
 P. chameleoni Krishnamurthy 1963
 P. ganapatii Saratchandra 1981
 P. grassei Saratchandra & Narasimhamurti 1980
 P. hareni (Ray & Singh 1949)
 P. hystrixi Todd 1963
 P. kakatiyae Bhaskar Rao et al. 1978
 P. krishnamurthyi Saratchandra & Ramesh Babu 1982
 P. longifila (Lemmermann 1913) Grassé 1926
 P. mabuiae Saratchandra, Vijayanand & Venkateswarlu 1984
 P. ophisauri Chikovani 1970
 P. rattusi Kalavathi, Saratchandra & Sambasivarao 1983
 P. regnardi 
 P. sanjivei Grewal 1966
 P. steinii Ettl 1984
 P. uromastixi Janakidevi 1962
 P. waltairensis Saratchandra & Narasimhamurti 1980
 P. warangalensis Bhaskar Rao et al. 1978
 P. lacertae (Grassé 1882)
 P. lacertae-viridis (Grassé 1879) Grassé 1926

References

Placidozoa
Heterokont genera